Dunleith is an unincorporated community located in Washington County, Mississippi.

The Dunleith Plantation was located here.  In the 1930s, it was considered one of the finest plantations in the Delta.  With a tile drainage system, it was valued at over US$1 million.

The Columbus and Greenville Railway runs through the community.  The Mount Elm Church is located in Dunleith.

Notable people
 Garland Green, soul singer and pianist.
 Jimmy Reed, blues musician.
 Alfred Holt Stone, planter, writer, politician, and tax commissioner.

References

Unincorporated communities in Washington County, Mississippi
Unincorporated communities in Mississippi